Nabha Natesh is an Indian model and actress who predominantly appears in Telugu and Kannada films. She made her film debut with Kannada film Vajrakaya in 2015 and  Telugu film debut with Nannu Dochukunduvate in 2018. She had her breakthrough with iSmart Shankar in 2019 due to which she is popularly referred as "Ismart Beauty" in the media.

Personal life
Nabha has a brother, Nahush Chakravarthy, who is an upcoming actor in Kannada industry.

Early life and education
Nabha went to school in her home town Sringeri and she then studied engineering in Information Technology from N.M.A.M. Institute of Technology, Udupi, Karnataka. She started modelling along with acting in plays under National Award-winning director Prakash Belawadi. She has trained in Bharatanatyam for brief period and choreographed and danced in multiple competitions during her school and college days. She was part of Top 11 list of Femina Miss India Bangalore 2013 and received the Miss Intellectual award. She underwent acting training at Abhinaya Taranga and her theatre career was started under Belawadi.

Career

Debut and breakthrough (2015–17)
Nabha made her acting debut at the age of 19, opposite Kannada actor Shiva Rajkumar, in the 2015 film Vajrakaya, which went on to complete over 100-days in multiple theatres in Karnataka. She has received critical appraisal from both critics and audience, critics heaped praise on her performance. Deccan Chronicles writer noted that "Nabha Natesh as Pataka who "fires up" the screen space for a little longer than the others." Times of Indias writer states that "Nabha Natesh is impressive as the tapori taking on Shivaraj Kumar" Sifys writer claimed that
"Nabha Natesh has done justice to her role" Indiaglitzs writer states that "Nabha Natesh conquers the heart from her dashing role. She is like wind." and she was nominated for  Filmfare Award for Best Female Debut –Kannada.

In 2017, she acted in Lee film opposite Sumanth Shailendra. In the same year she features in a special song in the film, Saheba.

Tollywood debut and widespread recognition (2018–19)
Nabha made her Telugu film debut opposite Sudheer Babu in Nannu Dochukunduvate in 2018. Deccan Chronicles writer stated, "The film is a perfect launch vehicle for Nabha, who is a livewire and completely steals the show." 123telugus writer said that "Nabha Natesh as she makes a striking debut. She is the life and soul of the film as Nabha breathes life into the role of Meghana." Times Of Indias writer states that "Nabha Natesh unleashes the livewire in her effectively amidst these characters." Indiagltzs writer writes that "Overall, the performance is a treat, complete with a heroine who gets to speak so much, Nabha is chirpy." Telugu360s writer noted that "New heroine Nabha is a good find, she suited Meghana role. Her bubbly characterization, new backdrop as a short film actress bring additional appeal to her role."

In 2019, she starred opposite Ram Pothineni in iSmart Shankar, which opened to decent reviews upon the release and went on to become a commercial hit at the box office and completed 100 days. Perception about her started to change with the success of the film ismart. New Indian Express reported, "She is reckoned as a new-gen actor, who can breathe life into any character she portrays." The speech that Nabha Natesh made during the pre-release of Ismart Shankar received a viral response, reaching 1 million views in less than 24 hours. Neeshita Nyayapati of Times Of India stated "Nabha however delivers an earnest performance with what she's offered." Editor of 123telugu.com claimed "Nabha Natesh is impressive as Chandni and provides superb eye candy for the masses." Editor of idlebrain.com wrote "Nabha Natesh did a mass character. She oozes glamour and did well." Editor of andhraboxoffice states "Nabha is pretty good and proves to be an able female protagonist."

Continued career (2020–present) 
In 2020, Nabha starred opposite Ravi Teja in Disco Raja, opened to mixed reviews and turned out be a box office failure. Later she acted in Solo Brathuke So Better, which opened to decent reviews from the audience and critics upon the release and went on to become a commercial hit at the box office. Nabha has received an applause for her character in the film as Amrutha. Times of India wrote "Nabha's character Amrutha is being liked by viewers. Her acting is receiving special attention of the fans. The talented actor's career has been soaring ever since she starred in the 2019 sci-fi action drama, iSmartShankar." 123 Telugu writer states "Nabha too got a lot of appreciation for her role as Amrutha. Especially, Tej and Nabha looked fresh on the screen and the comedy track between them was well received. She delivered a sensible and entertaining performance and showed her class."

In 2021, Nabha starred in Alludu Adhurs co-starring Bellamkonda Sreenivas and Sonu Sood. Her next film Maestro, was directly released on Hotstar. She starred alongside Nithiin and Tamannaah.

Filmography

Awards and nominations

References

External links 
 
 

1995 births
Actresses from Bangalore
Actresses in Kannada cinema
Living people
21st-century Indian actresses
Indian film actresses
Kannada actresses
People from Chikkamagaluru district
Actresses in Telugu cinema